Marine Tactical Air Command Squadron 48 (MTACS-48) is a reserve aviation command and control unit of the United States Marine Corps based at Naval Station Great Lakes, Illinois. They provide the 4th Marine Aircraft Wings tactical headquarters and command other units within Marine Air Control Group 48 when deployed.

Mission
Provide equipment, maintenance, and operations for the Tactical Air Command Center (TACC) of the Aviation Combat Element (ACE), as a component of the Marine Air-Ground Task Force (MAGTF). Equip, man, operate, and maintain the Current Operations section of the TACC. Provide and maintain a facility for the TACC Future Operations Section; and install and maintain associated automated systems.

History
Marine Tactical Air Command Squadron 48 (MTACS-48) was activated on 1 September 1967 at Naval Air Station Glenview, Illinois as Headquarters and Headquarters Squadron 48 (H&HS-48), Marine Air Control Group 48, 4th Marine Aircraft Wing.  The squadron was re-designated in on 1 May 1993 as Marine Tactical Air Command Squadron 48 (MTACS-48). The squadron relocated to Highwood, Illinois in 1995 and again in 2001 to their current location at Naval Station Great Lakes.

Since the September 11, 2001 attacks elements of MTACS-48 have mobilized to support Operation Iraqi Freedom in Iraq and Operation Enduring Freedom in Afghanistan.

Unit awards
Since the beginning of World War II, the United States military has honored various units for extraordinary heroism or outstanding non-combat service. This information is compiled by the United States Marine Corps History Division and is certified by the Commandant of the Marine Corps.

See also

 United States Marine Corps Aviation
 Organization of the United States Marine Corps
 List of United States Marine Corps aviation support units

References

 MTACS-48's official website

Tacc48
4th Marine Aircraft Wing
Military units and formations in Illinois